The following article presents a summary of the 1980 football (soccer) season in Brazil, which was the 79th season of competitive football in the country.

Campeonato Brasileiro Série A

Semifinals

|}

Final

Flamengo declared as the Campeonato Brasileiro champions by aggregate score of 3-3.

Campeonato Brasileiro Série B

Semifinals

|}

Final

Londrina declared as the Campeonato Brasileiro Série B champions by aggregate score of 5-1.

Promotion
The champion and the runner-up, which are Londrina and CSA, were promoted to the following year's first level.

State championship champions

(1)Cascavel and Colorado shared the Paraná State Championship title.

Youth competition champions

Other competition champions

Brazilian clubs in international competitions

Brazil national team
The following table lists all the games played by the Brazil national football team in official competitions and friendly matches during 1980.

References

 Brazilian competitions at RSSSF
 1980 Brazil national team matches at RSSSF

 
Seasons in Brazilian football
Brazil